Carl Georg Lehle (2 December 1872 in Eriskirch – 18 September 1939 in Ludwigshafen), also spelled as Karl, was a German rower who competed in the 1900 Summer Olympics. He was part of the German boat Ludwigshafener Ruderverein, which won the bronze medal in the coxed four final B.

References

External links

 

1872 births
1939 deaths
Olympic rowers of Germany
Rowers at the 1900 Summer Olympics
Olympic bronze medalists for Germany
Olympic medalists in rowing
German male rowers
Medalists at the 1900 Summer Olympics
Sportspeople from Tübingen (region)